Kinoto may refer to:
, the Japanese name for the second of the Heavenly Stems
, a grammatical marker used in Japanese kanbun
Any of the six  years in a sexagenary cycle

People and fictional characters with the name Kinoto include:
Kinoto Saito (born 1976), Japanese footballer
Masazo Kinoto, character JoJo's Bizarre Adventure: Diamond Is Unbreakable
Kinoto, character in Naruto: Shippuden (season 16)

See also
Kinoton, a German electronics manufacturer

Japanese masculine given names